Doodh Ka Karz (English: Debt of milk) is a 1990 Indian Bollywood action drama film directed by Ashok Gaekwad and produced by Salim Akhtar. The film was dubbed in Marathi as Dudhache Upkar. It stars Jackie Shroff and Neelam Kothari in pivotal roles.

Plot
Suraj is the only son of a widow, Parvati whose husband was killed. He falls in love with Reshma after saving her life from a snake bite.

Cast
 Jackie Shroff ... Suraj
 Neelam Kothari ... Reshma
Varsha Usgaonkar ....Kajari
 Prem Chopra ... Sampath
 Aruna Irani ... Parvati
 Amrish Puri ... Chhotey Thakur Raghuvir Singh
 Gulshan Grover ... Ajit B. Singh
 Goga Kapoor ... Dharma Lohar
 Sadashiv Amrapurkar ... Bhairav Singh
Master Rinku ...Junior Suraj
Sudhir as Jumman

Soundtrack
All songs were penner by Anand Bakshi and sung by Anuradha Paudwal and Mohammed Aziz. "Tumhain Dil Se Kaise.." and "Shuru Ho Rahi Hai.." were  popular songs from the movie.

References

External links

1990s Hindi-language films
1990 films
Films scored by Anu Malik
Films about snakes
Indian films about revenge
Films directed by Ashok Gaikwad
Films about shapeshifting